Elections to Lambeth London Borough Council were held on 7 May 1998. The whole council was up for election and the Labour Party took overall control of the council.

Election result

|}

Ward results
* – Existing Councillor seeking re-election.

Angell

Bishop's

Clapham Park

Clapham Town

Ferndale

Gipsy Hill

Herne Hill

Knight's Hill

Larkhall

Oval

Prince's

St Leonard's

St Martin's

Stockwell

Streatham Hill

Streatham South

Streatham Wells

Thornton

Thurlow Park

Town Hall

Tulse Hill

Vassall

References

1998
1998 London Borough council elections
20th century in the London Borough of Lambeth